Rudbar Mahalleh (also Romanized as Rūdbār Maḩalleh) is a village in Estakhr-e Posht Rural District, Hezarjarib District, Neka County, Mazandaran Province, Iran. At the 2006 census, its population was 24, in 7 families.

References 

Populated places in Neka County